Van Wert is a city in northern Decatur County, Iowa, United States. The population was 178 at the time of the 2020 census.

Geography
Van Wert is located on Route J14 east of I-35 approximately eight miles north of Decatur City and two miles south of the Decatur-Clarke county line.

History
Van Wert was first settled in 1853. It is named after Issac Van Wart.

Demographics

2010 census
At the 2010 census there were 230 people in 101 households, including 73 families, in the city. The racial makup of the city was 96.1% White, 2.2% Native American, and 1.7% from two or more races. Hispanic or Latino of any race were 1.3%.

Of the 101 households 26.7% had children under the age of 18 living with them, 56.4% were married couples living together, 12.9% had a female householder with no husband present, 3.0% had a male householder with no wife present, and 27.7% were non-families. 21.8% of households were one person and 8.9% were one person aged 65 or older. The average household size was 2.28 and the average family size was 2.63.

The median age was 48 years. 20.9% of residents were under the age of 18; 3.8% were between the ages of 18 and 24; 21.8% were from 25 to 44; 32.2% were from 45 to 64; and 21.3% were 65 or older. The gender makeup of the city was 46.1% male and 53.9% female.

2000 census
At the 2000 census there were 231 people in 103 households, including 64 families, in the city. The racial makup of the city was 99.13% White, and 0.87% from two or more races. Hispanic or Latino of any race were 0.87%.

Of the 103 households 26.2% had children under the age of 18 living with them, 55.3% were married couples living together, 4.9% had a female householder with no husband present, and 36.9% were non-families. 33.0% of households were one person and 11.7% were one person aged 65 or older. The average household size was 2.24 and the average family size was 2.85.

The age distribution was 22.1% under the age of 18, 10.8% from 18 to 24, 25.1% from 25 to 44, 26.8% from 45 to 64, and 15.2% 65 or older. The median age was 41 years. For every 100 females, there were 104.4 males. For every 100 females age 18 and over, there were 93.5 males.

The median household income was $34,375 and the median family income  was $44,375. Males had a median income of $26,000 versus $18,194 for females. The per capita income for the city was $16,564. About 4.2% of families and 5.6% of the population were below the poverty line, including none of those under the age of eighteen and 17.2% of those sixty five or over.

References

Cities in Iowa
Cities in Decatur County, Iowa